Indolizidine is a heterocyclic chemical compound that forms the central core of the indolizidine alkaloids such as swainsonine and castanospermine.

See also
 Indole
 Indolizine
 Tryptophan
 Tryptamine

References

Indolizidines